The Shire of Newham and Woodend was a local government area about  northwest of Melbourne, the state capital of Victoria, Australia.

History

The Woodend, Newham and Rochford Road District was incorporated on 3 December 1861, and became the Shire of Newham on 6 April 1871. Following its union with the Borough of Woodend on 11 January 1905, it became the Shire of Newham and Woodend.

On 19 January 1995, the Shire of Newham and Woodend was abolished, and along with the Shires of Gisborne, Kyneton and Romsey, was merged into the newly created Shire of Macedon Ranges.

Wards

Newham and Woodend was divided into three ridings on 7 May 1953, each of which elected three councillors:
 Campaspe Riding
 Newham Riding
 Woodend Riding

Towns and localities
 Ashbourne
 Cadello
 Campaspe
 Cobaw
 Hanging Rock
 Hesket
 Mount Macedon (parts)
 Newham
 Woodend*
 Woodend North

* Council seat.

Population

* Estimate in the 1958 Victorian Year Book.

References

External links
 Victorian Places - Newham and Woodend Shire

Newham and Woodend
1861 establishments in Australia